Rex Alan Howe (born 1929) was an Anglican priest.

He was born in 1929 and after national service with the Army Catering Corps studied at Christ's College, Cambridge. He then attended the  College of the Resurrection Mirfield and was ordained in 1956. After curacies in Barnsley and Helmsley he held incumbencies in Middlesbrough, Redcar and Kirkleatham. He was Rural Dean of Guisborough from 1967 to 1973. In 1973 he became Dean of Hong Kong; and its Archdeacon in 1975.  Later he was Rector of Grantham, and a Canon Prebendary of Lincoln Cathedral before his final post as Vicar of Canford Cliffs and Sandbanks. He retired in 1994.

References
 

1929 births
Alumni of Christ's College, Cambridge
Alumni of the College of the Resurrection
Deans of Hong Kong
Archdeacons of Hong Kong
Living people
Army Catering Corps soldiers
20th-century British Army personnel